Sugar Creek Elementary School or Sugarcreek Elementary School may refer to:

Sugar Creek Elementary School, Bentonville School District, Bentonville, Arkansas
Sugar Creek Elementary School, McLean County Unit District No. 5, Normal, Illinois
Sugar Creek Elementary School, North Montgomery School Corporation, Montgomery County, Indiana
Sugar Creek Elementary School, Community School Corporation of Southern Hancock County, New Palestine, Indiana
Sugar Creek Elementary School, Independence Public School District, Sugar Creek, Missouri
Sugar Creek Elementary School, York County School District 4, Fort Mill, South Carolina
Sugar Creek Elementary School, Verona Area School District, Verona, Wisconsin
Sugarcreek Elementary School, Karns City Area School District, Cowansville, Pennsylvania